David Rosen is an American literary scholar. He is a professor at Trinity College, Connecticut.

Biography 
Rosen received his BA from Columbia University, MA and PhD from Yale University. He was an instructor at Yale, and joined the faculty of Trinity College, Connecticut, in 2002. Rosen's scholarship has focused on poetry and the evolution of the concept of privacy.

Rosen won the James Russell Lowell Prize from the Modern Language Association in 2013 for co-authoring The Watchman in Pieces: Surveillance, Literature, and Liberal Personhood (2013) with Aaron Santesso. The book explores the way in which literature has shaped, and in turn been shaped by, surveillance and privacy practices since the Renaissance.

References 

Living people
Columbia College (New York) alumni
Yale University alumni
Trinity College (Connecticut) faculty
Year of birth missing (living people)
Literary scholars